The Garrick/Milne Prize was a biennial art prize which served to revive the art of theatrical painting and portraiture. The prize was set up by the Garrick Club in memory of A. A. Milne, a past member.

Originally £20,000, the prize was last held in 2005 and has since been replaced by direct commissions.

2001
Winner
Yolanda Sonnabend
Shortlist
Rob Piercy
Stuart Pearson Wright (placed 3rd)

2003
Winner
Anna Hyunsook Paik – Anna Hyunsook Paik, Rehearsal at RADA
Shortlist
Emma Kennaway – Timothy West as King Lear
Anna Hyunsook Paik – Anna Hyunsook Paik, Rehearsal at RADA
June Crisfield Chapman – I am not Bid for Love (Henry Goodman as Shylock)
Helen F. Wilson – Scottish Ballet 11am
Luke Martineau – Do I Stand There? (placed 2nd)

2005
Winner
Stuart Pearson Wright – Michael Gambon
Shortlist
Peter Mullan
Tony Beaver - Tommy Cooper

See also

 List of European art awards

References

British art awards
Awards established in 2001
Awards disestablished in 2005